The 2009 Seattle Mariners season was the 33rd season in franchise history.  They improved upon a disappointing 2008 season, where they finished last in the American League West with a 61–101 record. They finished 3rd in the AL West with an 85–77 record, a 24 win improvement. The 2009 Mariners became the 13th team in MLB history to have a winning record following a 100+ loss season. On September 13, 2009, Ichiro Suzuki got his 200th hit of the season. In the process, he set a new MLB record by getting at least 200 hits for nine consecutive seasons, passing the mark held by Wee Willie Keeler.

Overview 

Even before Opening Day, the season was marked with a flurry of change, most notably with the hiring of new general manager Jack Zduriencik, field manager Don Wakamatsu, and an entirely new major-league coaching staff. Unlike the previous season, which was approached with an expectation to contend for the AL West division title, the 2009 season has been approached with a rebuilding philosophy and a departure from the team-building strategies used in previous seasons. In January the Mariners unveiled their 2009 slogan, "A New Day, A New Way", to reflect their rebuilding philosophy.

In terms of players, this season was marked by the free agency departure of outfielder Raúl Ibáñez, who signed with the Philadelphia Phillies, and the trade of closer J. J. Putz to the New York Mets. However, the offseason has been most notable for the acquisition of longtime Mariners outfielder Ken Griffey Jr., nearly 10 years after trading him to the Cincinnati Reds. Other notable acquisitions have included outfielders Franklin Gutiérrez and Endy Chávez (both from the Putz trade), new closer David Aardsma (traded by Boston Red Sox) and long-time Kansas City Royals infielder Mike Sweeney (free agent).

This season also marks the 10th anniversary of Safeco Field, the Mariners' home stadium which opened its gates on July 15, 1999.

Offseason

Front office changes

On June 16, 2008, then-general manager Bill Bavasi was dismissed after a disappointing 24–46 start, with vice president-assistant GM Lee Pelekoudas selected as his interim replacement. During the off-season, the Mariners began their search for a new general manager with several candidates to be interviewed including Pelekoudas himself.

After an extensive search, the Mariners selected Milwaukee Brewers executive Jack Zduriencik, who was most notable for his drafting skills and credited with turning the Brewers into a playoff team, as their new general manager on October 22, 2008. Pelekoudas was retained as assistant GM, but resigned on September 1, 2009.

Coaching changes

In addition to relieving GM Bill Bavasi of his duties, the Mariners also fired manager John McLaren on June 19, 2008. Bench coach Jim Riggleman was selected as the interim manager for the rest of the 2008 season.

On November 19, 2008, the Mariners named Oakland Athletics bench coach Don Wakamatsu as their new manager. With the hiring, Wakamatsu becomes the first Asian-American manager in Major League Baseball. Wakamatsu then dismissed all of the coaching staff hired under the McLaren-Riggleman tenure, and hired Ty Van Burkleo as bench coach and Lee Tinsley as first base coach, while Rick Adair and John Wetteland were hired as the pitching and bullpen coaches respectively. Alan Cockrell was brought in as the new hitting coach.

Roster changes

Key departures

Raúl Ibáñez, who led the team in RBIs in 2008, signed a 3-year, $31.5 million deal with the Philadelphia Phillies after a five-year tenure with the Mariners. Ibáñez, who was a Type A free agent, allowed the Mariners to receive the Phillies' first round pick in the 2009 MLB draft and also a compensatory pick as well.

On December 10, in a three-team trade, Zduriencik sent former All-Star closer J. J. Putz, outfielder Jeremy Reed and pitcher Sean Green to the New York Mets and prospect Luis Valbuena to the Cleveland Indians, in exchange for a combined seven players from both teams, most notably the Indians' Franklin Gutiérrez and the Mets' Endy Chávez.

On July 10, the Mariners sent shortstop Yuniesky Betancourt to the Kansas City Royals in exchange for two minor-league pitchers.

Key additions

The Mariners made numerous additions in free agency, adding over 17 players to the team. On December 3, the Mariners made their first move in the offseason by signing 1B Russell Branyan to a one-year deal. Branyan was one of the players that Zdurienck saw potential in during his time with the Brewers. Mike Sweeney, formerly a fan favorite and leader in the Royals organization, was signed as well to a minor-league deal.

Next, the Mariners received 7 players in the three team trade (see above) that netted them outfielders Endy Chávez and Franklin Gutierrez, pitcher Aaron Heilman, and four other minor leaguers including prospect Mike Carp and pitcher Jason Vargas. Heilman, however, would be traded to the Chicago Cubs almost a month later, in exchange for utility player Ronny Cedeño and pitcher Garrett Olson.
Seattle also traded for pitcher David Aardsma from the Boston Red Sox in exchange for a minor leaguer.

Griffey's return

Perhaps the biggest move in the offseason, however, was the signing of former Mariner Ken Griffey Jr. to a 1-year deal. Griffey, who was known as the man who "saved baseball in Seattle", received a warm welcome and a fifteen-minute presentation that applauds his tenure as a Mariner when his former team, the Cincinnati Reds, visited Safeco Field in 2007. Surprised by the reaction, Griffey explored the possibility of a return in Seattle. The Mariners reportedly were trying to negotiate with Griffey until the Atlanta Braves also want to sign him as well. Griffey was inclined to sign with Atlanta due to the proximity from his home, but choose to instead return to Seattle. Most, if not all, Mariners fans were ecstatic about the news, and orders of Griffey jerseys were off the charts.

Complete transactions

2008
October 22 Hired general manager Jack Zduriencik.
November 19 Hired field manager Don Wakamatsu.
December 1 Hired Ty Van Burkleo and Lee Tinsley as bench and first base coaches, respectively.
December 3 Signed free agent IF Russell Branyan; hired Rick Adair and John Wetteland as pitching and bullpen coaches, respectively.
December 7 Hired hitting coach Alan Cockrell.
December 10 Negotiated 3-way trade with New York Mets and Cleveland Indians:
OF Jeremy Reed, RHP J. J. Putz, and RHP Sean Green to New York; IF Luis Valbuena to Cleveland
Cleveland OF Franklin Gutiérrez to Seattle; New York OF Endy Chávez, RHP Aaron Heilman and four minor leaguers to Seattle.
December 23 Signed free agent C Jamie Burke to a minor league contract, two weeks after non-tendering him.

2009
January 6 Signed free agent RHP Tyler Walker.
January 19 Agreed to contract terms with RHP Félix Hernández, LHP Érik Bédard, and RHP Aaron Heilman, thereby avoiding salary arbitration.
January 20 Traded minor-league (Class A) LHP Fabian Williamson to Boston Red Sox for RHP David Aardsma.
January 28 Traded RHP Aaron Heilman to Chicago Cubs for LHP Garrett Olson and INF Ronny Cedeño; released RHP Randy Messenger.
January 29 Signed free agent 1B/DH Mike Sweeney to a minor league deal.
January 30 Re-signed RHP Randy Messenger to a minor league deal.
February 5 Signed free agent LHP Tyler Johnson to a minor league deal.
February 15 Claimed minor-league RHP Luis Peña off waivers from Milwaukee Brewers; designated INF Tug Hulett for assignment.
February 18 Signed free agent OF Ken Griffey Jr.
February 23 Re-signed OF Mike Wilson to a minor league deal, two days after releasing him.
March 13 Signed free agent RHP Chad Cordero to a minor league deal.
March 15 Claimed RHP Jesús Delgado off waivers from Florida Marlins, signed to minor-league deal.
March 29 Acquired utility player Chris Burke from San Diego Padres for cash considerations; released RHP Tyler Walker.
April 3 Placed OF Ichiro Suzuki on 15-day disabled list retroactive to March 31 due to bleeding ulcer.
April 15 Placed LHP Ryan Rowland-Smith on 15-day disabled list retroactive to April 10 due to triceps tendinitis.
April 16 Placed C Kenji Johjima on 15-day disabled list due to strained right hamstring; added C Jamie Burke and RHP Sean White to 40-man roster and activated both to take Rowland-Smith's and Johjima's places on active roster.
April 21 Traded utility player Chris Burke back to San Diego Padres for cash considerations.
May 2 Placed RHP Brandon Morrow on 15-day disabled list retroactive to April 24 due to biceps tendinitis; added LHP Jason Vargas to 40-man roster.
May 6 Placed RHP Shawn Kelley on 15-day disabled list due to strained oblique muscle; recalled LHP Garrett Olson.
May 9 Placed RHP Carlos Silva on 15-day disabled list retroactive to May 7 due to right shoulder inflammation; activated RHP Brandon Morrow from disabled list.
May 26 Placed C Kenji Johjima to 15-day disabled list due to broken left big toe; added C Guillermo Quiróz to 40-man roster; transferred LHP Cesar Jimenez from 15-day disabled list to 60-day disabled list.
June 7 Designated RHP Denny Stark for assignment; recalled C Jamie Burke.
June 17 Placed LHP Érik Bédard to 15-day disabled list, retroactive June 8; recalled 1B Mike Carp to 40-man roster.
June 20 Placed OF Endy Chávez to 60-day disabled list due to torn ligaments and cartilage in right knee; added SS Josh Wilson to 25-man roster.
June 28 Acquired OF Ryan Langerhans from the Washington Nationals in exchange for utility player Mike Morse.
June 30 Placed 3B Adrián Beltré to 15-day disabled list due to left shoulder surgery retroactive June 29; added OF Ryan Langerhans to 25-man roster; outrighted C Jamie Burke to Triple-A Tacoma.
July 7 Places 1B Mike Sweeney on 15-day disabled list retroactive to July 6; activated LHP Érik Bédard from disabled list.
July 10 Traded SS Yuniesky Betancourt to Kansas City Royals for minor-league RHP Danny Cortes and LHP Derrick Saito
July 11 Acquired 3B Jack Hannahan from the Oakland Athletics in exchange for minor league RHP Justin Souza.
July 11 Optioned RHP Brandon Morrow to AAA Tacoma.
July 21 Designated IF Josh Wilson for assignment; activated 1B Mike Sweeney from the 15-day disabled list.
July 24 Designated RHP Roy Corcoran for assignment; recalled RHP Ryan Rowland-Smith from Triple-A Tacoma.
July 24 Outrighted IF Josh Wilson to Triple-A Tacoma.
July 26 Designated OF Wladimir Balentien for assignment; purchased the contract of OF Michael Saunders from Triple-A Tacoma.
July 27 Placed LHP Érik Bédard on the 15-day disabled list; recalled pitcher Jason Vargas from Triple-A Tacoma.
July 29 Acquired SS Jack Wilson and RHP Ian Snell from the Pittsburgh Pirates in exchange for SS Ronny Cedeño, C/1B Jeff Clement, and RHP pitching prospects Aaron Pribanic, Brett Lorin and Nathan Adcock.
July 29 Acquired RHP Robert Manuel from the Cincinnati Reds in exchange for OF Wladimir Balentien.
July 31 Acquired LHP Lucas French and Mauricio Robles from the Detroit Tigers in exchange for LHP Jarrod Washburn.
July 31 Recalled RHP Ian Snell from Triple-A Tacoma.
August 1 Designated 1B Chris Shelton for assignment.
August 4 Activated 3B Adrián Beltré from the 15-day disabled list; designated IF Chris Woodward for assignment.
August 5 Outrighted 1B Chris Shelton to Triple-A Tacoma.
August 7 Optioned LHP Jason Vargas to Triple-A Tacoma.
August 7 Called up RHP Doug Fister Triple-A Tacoma.

Regular season

Season standings

Division standings

Record vs. opponents

Game log 

|- bgcolor="ffbbbb"
|- align="center" bgcolor="bbffbb"
| 1 || April 6 || @ Twins || 6–1 || Hernández (1–0) || Liriano (0–1) || || 48,514 || 1–0
|- align="center" bgcolor="ffbbbb"
| 2 || April 7 || @ Twins || 6–5 || Ayala (1–0) || Morrow (0–1) || || 23,755 || 1–1
|- align="center" bgcolor="ffbbbb"
| 3 || April 8 || @ Twins || 6–5 || Slowey (1–0) || Silva (0–1) || Nathan (1) || 22,270 || 1–2
|- align="center" bgcolor="bbffbb"
| 4 || April 9 || @ Twins || 2–0 || Washburn (1–0) || Perkins (0–1) || Morrow (1) || 20,105 || 2–2
|- align="center" bgcolor="bbffbb"
| 5 || April 10 || @ Athletics || 5–4 || Jakubauskas (1–0) || Anderson (0–1) || Aardsma (1) || 36,067 || 3–2
|- align="center" bgcolor="bbffbb"
| 6 || April 11 || @ Athletics || 8–5 || Batista (1–0) || Casilla (0–1) || Morrow (2) || 19,560 || 4–2
|- align="center" bgcolor="bbffbb"
| 7 || April 12 || @ Athletics || 1–0 || Bédard (1–0) || Cahill (0–1) || Aardsma (2) || 12,127 || 5–2
|- align="center" bgcolor="bbffbb"
| 8 || April 14 || Angels || 3 – 2 (10) || Corcoran (1–0) || Shields (0–1) || || 45,958 || 6–2
|- align="center" bgcolor="bbffbb"
| 9 || April 15 || Angels || 11–3 || Washburn (2–0) || Weaver (1–1) || || 18,516 || 7–2
|- align="center" bgcolor="ffbbbb"
| 10 || April 16 || Angels || 5–1 || Saunders (2–1) || Jakubauskas (1–1) || || 18,528 || 7–3
|- align="center" bgcolor="bbffbb"
| 11 || April 17 || Tigers || 6–3 || Hernández (2–0) || Verlander (0–2) || Morrow (3) || 35,824 || 8–3
|- align="center" bgcolor="ffbbbb"
| 12 || April 18 || Tigers || 2–0 || Jackson (1–0) || Bédard (1–1) || Rodney (3) || 31,966 || 8–4
|- align="center" bgcolor="ffbbbb"
| 13 || April 19 || Tigers || 8–2 || Porcello (1–1) || Silva (0–2) || || 30,450 || 8–5
|- align="center" bgcolor="bbffbb"
| 14 || April 21 || Rays || 4–2 || Washburn (3–0) || Sonnanstine (0–2) || Morrow (4) || 19,582 || 9–5
|- align="center" bgcolor="ffbbbb"
| 15 || April 22 || Rays || 9–3 || Niemann (1–2) || Jakubauskas (1–2) || || 16,476 || 9–6
|- align="center" bgcolor="bbffbb"
| 16 || April 23 || Rays || 1–0 || Hernández (3–0) || Shields (2–2) || Morrow (5) || 17,639 || 10–6
|- align="center" bgcolor="bbffbb"
| 17 || April 24 || @ Angels || 8–3 || Bédard (2–1) || Loux (0–2) || || 43,083 || 11–6
|- align="center" bgcolor="bbffbb"
| 18 || April 25 || @ Angels || 9–8 || Silva (1–2) || Ortega (0–1) || Aardsma (3) || 43,542 || 12–6
|- align="center" bgcolor="ffbbbb"
| 19 || April 26 || @ Angels || 8–0 || Weaver (2–1) || Washburn (3–1) || || 43,057 || 12–7
|- align="center" bgcolor="bbbbbb"
| || April 27 || @ White Sox || colspan=6 |Postponed
|- align="center" bgcolor="ffbbbb"
| 20 || April 28 || @ White Sox || 2–1 || Colón (2–1) || Jakubauskas (1–3) || Jenks (4) || || 12–8
|- align="center" bgcolor="bbffbb"
| 21 || April 28 || @ White Sox || 9–1 || Hernández (4–0) || Danks (2–1) || || 25,042 || 13–8
|- align="center" bgcolor="ffbbbb"
| 22 || April 29 || @ White Sox || 6–3 || Thornton (1–1) || Kelley (0–1) || Jenks (5) || 18,023 || 13–9
|-

|- bgcolor="ffbbbb"
|- align="center" bgcolor="bbffbb"
| 23 || May 1 || Athletics || 8–7 || Kelley (1–1) || Springer (0–1) || || 25,760 || 14–9
|- align="center" bgcolor="ffbbbb"
| 24 || May 2 || Athletics || 3–2 || Bailey (3–0) || Aardsma (0–1) || Wuertz (2) || 29,484 || 14–10
|- align="center" bgcolor="bbffbb"
| 25 || May 3 || Athletics || 8 – 7 (15) || Vargas (1–0) || Eveland (1–2) || || 29,963 || 15–10
|- align="center" bgcolor="ffbbbb"
| 26 || May 4 || Rangers || 6–5 || Millwood (3–2) || Hernández (4–1) || Francisco (8) || 16,421 || 15–11
|- align="center" bgcolor="ffbbbb"
| 27 || May 5 || Rangers || 7 – 2 (10) || O'Day (1–0) || Stark (0–1) || || 19,810 || 15–12
|- align="center" bgcolor="ffbbbb"
| 28 || May 6 || @ Royals || 9–1 || Ponson (1–4) || Silva (1–3) || || 15,324 || 15–13
|- align="center" bgcolor="ffbbbb"
| 29 || May 7 || @ Royals || 3–1 || Bannister (3–0) || Washburn (3–2) || Soria (7) || 32,714 || 15–14
|- align="center" bgcolor="ffbbbb"
| 30 || May 8 || @ Twins || 11–0 || Baker (1–4) || Jakubauskas (1–4) || || 29,714 || 15–15
|- align="center" bgcolor="ffbbbb"
| 31 || May 9 || @ Twins || 9–6 || Liriano (2–4) || Hernández (4–2) || Nathan (5) || 29,552 || 15–16
|- align="center" bgcolor="bbffbb"
| 32 || May 10 || @ Twins || 5–3 || Batista (2–0) || Crain (1–1) || Morrow (6) || 25,555 || 16–16
|- align="center" bgcolor="ffbbbb"
| 33 || May 12 || @ Rangers || 7–1 || Holland (1–1) || Lowe (0–1) || || 16,564 || 16–17
|- align="center" bgcolor="ffbbbb"
| 34 || May 13 || @ Rangers || 6 – 5 (11) || Wilson (2–2) || Morrow (0–2) || || 25,865 || 16–18
|- align="center" bgcolor="ffbbbb"
| 35 || May 14 || @ Rangers || 3–2 || Harrison (4–2) || Morrow (0–3) || || 21,002 || 16–19
|- align="center" bgcolor="bbffbb"
| 36 || May 15 || Red Sox || 5–4 || Jakubauskas (2–4) || Lester (2–4) || Aardsma (4) || 34,952 || 17–19
|- align="center" bgcolor="ffbbbb"
| 37 || May 16 || Red Sox || 5–3 || Beckett (4–2) || Olson (0–1) || Papelbon (10) || 42,589 || 17–20
|- align="center" bgcolor="bbffbb"
| 38 || May 17 || Red Sox || 3–2 || Aardsma (1–1) || Ramírez (4–1) || || 40,833 || 18–20
|- align="center" bgcolor="ffbbbb"
| 39 || May 18 || Angels || 10–6 || Lackey (1–0) || Washburn (3–3) || || 17,340 || 18–21
|- align="center" bgcolor="ffbbbb"
| 40 || May 19 || Angels || 6–5 || Palmer (5–0) || Hernández (4–3) || Fuentes (10) || 16,002 || 18–22
|- align="center" bgcolor="bbffbb"
| 41 || May 20 || Angels || 1–0 || Jakubauskas (3–4) || Santana (0–1) || Aardsma (5) || 18,580 || 19–22
|- align="center" bgcolor="ffbbbb"
| 42 || May 21 || Angels || 3–0 || Saunders (6–2) || Bédard (2–2) || Fuentes (11) || 18,468 || 19–23
|- align="center" bgcolor="bbffbb"
| 43 || May 22 || Giants || 2 – 1 (12) || White (1–0) || Miller (1–1) || || 38,520 || 20–23
|- align="center" bgcolor="ffbbbb"
| 44 || May 23 || Giants || 5–1 || Cain (5–1) || Lowe (0–2) || || 33,348 || 20–24
|- align="center" bgcolor="bbffbb"
| 45 || May 24 || Giants || 5–4 || Hernández (5–3) || Zito (1–5) || Aardsma (6) || 36,616 || 21–24
|- align="center" bgcolor="ffbbbb"
| 46 || May 25 || @ Athletics || 6–1 || Anderson (2–4) || Jakubauskas (3–5) || Cameron (1) || 15,280 || 21–25
|- align="center" bgcolor="ffbbbb"
| 47 || May 26 || @ Athletics || 4–3 || Braden (4–5) || Batista (2–1) || Bailey (2) || 10,371 || 21–26
|- align="center" bgcolor="bbffbb"
| 48 || May 27 || @ Athletics || 6–1 || Bédard (3–2) || Cahill (2–5) || || 30,012 || 22–26
|- align="center" bgcolor="bbffbb"
| 49 || May 29 || @ Angels || 5–2 || Vargas (2–0) || Lackey (1–1) || Aardsma (7) || 38,492 || 23–26
|- align="center" bgcolor="bbffbb"
| 50 || May 30 || @ Angels || 4 – 3 (10) || Batista (3–1) || Arredondo (1–2) || Aardsma (8) || 39,329 || 24–26
|- align="center" bgcolor="ffbbbb"
| 51 || May 31 || @ Angels || 9–8 || Speier (1–1) || Aardsma (1–2) || || 38,632 || 24–27
|-

|- bgcolor="ffbbbb"
|- align="center" bgcolor="ffbbbb"
| 52 || June 1 || Orioles || 1–0 || Hill (2–0) || Washburn (3–4) || Sherrill (11) || 16,979 || 24–28
|- align="center" bgcolor="bbffbb"
| 53 || June 2 || Orioles || 8–2 || Bédard (4–2) || Hernández (1–1) || || 17,978 || 25–28
|- align="center" bgcolor="bbffbb"
| 54 || June 3 || Orioles || 3–2 || Aardsma (2–2) || Johnson (2–3) || || 18,650 || 26–28
|- align="center" bgcolor="ffbbbb"
| 55 || June 5 || Twins || 2 – 1 (10) || Guerrier (2–0) || Lowe (0–3) || Nathan (11) || 35,808 || 26–29
|- align="center" bgcolor="bbffbb"
| 56 || June 6 || Twins || 2–1 || Jakubauskas (4–5) || Henn (0–1) || Aardsma (9) || 30,600 || 27–29
|- align="center" bgcolor="bbffbb"
| 57 || June 7 || Twins || 4–2 || Bédard (5–2) || Slowey (8–2) || White (1) || 37,714 || 28–29
|- align="center" bgcolor="ffbbbb"
| 58 || June 9 || @ Orioles || 3–1 || Bergesen (3–2) || Vargas (2–1) || Sherrill (12) || 17,358 || 28–30
|- align="center" bgcolor="bbffbb"
| 59 || June 10 || @ Orioles || 4–1 || Hernández (6–3) || Guthrie (4–6) || Aardsma (10) || 12,770 || 29–30
|- align="center" bgcolor="bbffbb"
| 60 || June 11 || @ Orioles || 6–3 || Olson (1–1) || Uehara (2–4) || Aardsma (11) || 12,260 || 30–30
|- align="center" bgcolor="ffbbbb"
| 61 || June 12 || @ Rockies || 6–4 || Jiménez (5–6) || Washburn (3–5) || || 30,365 || 30–31
|- align="center" bgcolor="ffbbbb"
| 62 || June 13 || @ Rockies || 5–3 || Corpas (1–3) || Lowe (0–4) || Street (13) || 31,101 || 30–32
|- align="center" bgcolor="ffbbbb"
| 63 || June 14 || @ Rockies || 7–1 || Hammel (4–3) || Vargas (2–2) || || 38,614 || 30–33
|- align="center" bgcolor="bbffbb"
| 64 || June 16 || @ Padres || 5–0 || Hernández (7–3) || Correia (3–5) || || 17,040 || 31–33
|- align="center" bgcolor="bbffbb"
| 65 || June 17 || @ Padres || 4–3 || Olson (2–1) || Gaudin (2–6) || Aardsma (12) || 20,224 || 32–33
|- align="center" bgcolor="ffbbbb"
| 66 || June 18 || @ Padres || 4–3 || Bell (3–1) || Batista (3–2) || || 25,416 || 32–34
|- align="center" bgcolor="bbffbb"
| 67 || June 19 || Diamondbacks || 4–3 ||Batista (4–2) || Peña (5–3) || Aardsma (13) || 27,319 || 33–34
|- align="center" bgcolor="bbffbb"
| 68 || June 20 || Diamondbacks || 7–3 || Vargas (3–2) || Buckner (2–4) || Aardsma (14) || 29,525 || 34–34
|- align="center" bgcolor="bbffbb"
| 69 || June 21 || Diamondbacks || 3–2 || Lowe (1–4) || Zavada (1–1) || || 37,251 || 35–34 
|- align="center" bgcolor="ffbbbb"
| 70 || June 23 || Padres || 7–9 || Gaudin (3–6) || Olson (2–2) || Bell (20) || 23,537 || 35–35 
|- align="center" bgcolor="bbffbb"
| 71 || June 24 || Padres || 4–3 ||White (2–0) || Mujica (2–3) || Aardsma (15) || 22,988 || 36–35 
|- align="center" bgcolor="bbffbb"
| 72 || June 25 || Padres || 9–3 || Washburn (4–5) || Leblanc (0–1) || || 27,968 || 37–35 
|- align="center" bgcolor="ffbbbb"
| 73 || June 26 || @ Dodgers || 8–2 || Kershaw (5–5) || Vargas (3–3) || || 50,752 || 37–36
|- align="center" bgcolor="bbffbb"
| 74 || June 27 || @ Dodgers || 5–1 || Hernández (8–3) || Milton (2–1) || || 50,847 || 38–36 
|- align="center" bgcolor="bbffbb"
| 75 || June 28 || @ Dodgers || 4–2 || Olson (3–2) || Kuroda (2–4) || Aardsma (16) || 49,355 || 39–36 
|- align="center" bgcolor="ffbbbb"
| 76 || June 30 || @ Yankees || 8–5 || Bruney (3–0) || White (2–1) || Rivera (19) || 46,181 || 39–37 
|-

|- bgcolor="ffbbbb"
|- align="center" bgcolor="ffbbbb"
| 77 || July 1 || @ Yankees || 4–2 || Pettitte (8–3) || Washburn (4–6) || Rivera (20) || 45,285 || 39–38
|- align="center" bgcolor="bbffbb"
| 78 || July 2 || @ Yankees || 8–4 || Batista (5–2) || Sabathia (7–5) || || 46,142 || 40–38 
|- align="center" bgcolor="bbffbb"
| 79 || July 3 || @ Red Sox || 7 – 6 (11) ||Jakubauskas (5–5) || Ramírez (5–3) ||Lowe (1) || 38,078 || 41–38 
|- align="center" bgcolor="bbffbb"
| 80 || July 4 || @ Red Sox || 3–2 ||Corcoran (2–0) || Saito (2–2) || Aardsma (17) || 37,656 || 42–38 
|- align="center" bgcolor="ffbbbb"
| 81 || July 5 || @ Red Sox || 8–4 || Masterson (3–2) || Batista (5–3) || || 37,691 || 42–39 
|- align="center" bgcolor="bbffbb"
| 82 || July 6 || Orioles || 5–0 || Washburn (5–6) || Bergesen (5–3) || || 24,018 || 43–39 
|- align="center" bgcolor="ffbbbb"
| 83 || July 7 || Orioles || 12–4 || Hendrickson (4–4) || Jakubauskas (5–6) || || 19,340 || 43–40
|- align="center" bgcolor="ffbbbb"
| 84 || July 8 || Orioles || 5–3 || Bass (5–2) || Aardsma (2–3) || Sherill (19) || 27,040 || 43–41 
|- align="center" bgcolor="bbffbb"
| 85 || July 9 || Rangers || 3–1 || Hernández (9–3) || Wilson (4–4) || Aardsma (18) || 24,823 || 44–41
|- align="center" bgcolor="ffbbbb"
| 86 || July 10 || Rangers || 6–4 || Feldman (8–2) || Morrow (0–4) || Francisco (15) || 34,874 || 44–42 
|- align="center" bgcolor="bbffbb"
| 87 || July 11 || Rangers || 4–1 || Washburn (6–6) || Millwood (8–7) || Aardsma (19) || 30,698 || 45–42
|- align="center" bgcolor="bbffbb"
| 88 || July 12 || Rangers || 5–3 || Batista (6–3) || O'day (2–1) || Aardsma (20) || 33,220 || 46–42 
|- align="center" bgcolor="ffbbbb"
| 89 || July 16 || @ Indians || 4–1 || Lee (5–9) || Olson (3–3) || || 22,371 || 46–43 
|- align="center" bgcolor="bbffbb"
| 90 || July 17 || @ Indians || 6–2 || Hernández (10–3) || Huff (4–4) || || 23,545 || 47–43 
|- align="center" bgcolor="bbffbb"
| 91 || July 18 || @ Indians || 3–1 || Washburn (7–6) || Ohka (0–4) || Aardsma (21) || 24,893 || 48–43 
|- align="center" bgcolor="bbffbb"
| 92 || July 19 || @ Indians || 5–3 ||Kelly (2–1) || Betancourt (1–2) || Aardsma (22) || 20,900 || 49–43
|- align="center" bgcolor="ffbbbb"
| 93 || July 21 || @ Tigers || 9–7 || Porcello (9–6) || Olson (3–4) || Rodney (20) || 32,906 || 49–44 
|- align="center" bgcolor="bbffbb"
| 94 || July 22 || @ Tigers || 2–1 || Hernández (11–3) || Seay (1–2) || Aardsma (23) || 29,758 || 50–44 
|- align="center" bgcolor="bbffbb"
| 95 || July 23 || @ Tigers || 2–1 || Washburn (8–6) || French (1–1) || Aardsma (24) || 32,177 || 51–44
|- align="center" bgcolor="ffbbbb"
| 96 || July 24 || Indians || 9–0 || Laffey (4–2) || Rowland-Smith (0–1) || || 34,802 || 51–45
|- align="center" bgcolor="ffbbbb"
| 97 || July 25 || Indians || 10–3 || Sowers (3–7) || Bédard (5–3) || || 29,213 || 51–46
|- align="center" bgcolor="ffbbbb"
| 98 || July 26 || Indians || 12–3 || Lee (7–9) || Vargas (3–4) || || 30,224 || 51–47
|- align="center" bgcolor="ffbbbb"
| 99 || July 27 || Blue Jays || 11–4 || Romero (9–4) || Hernández (11–4) || || 28,696 || 51–48
|- align="center" bgcolor="bbffbb"
| 100 || July 28 || Blue Jays || 4–3 || Aardsma (3–3) || Downs (1–3) || || 26,148 || 52–48
|- align="center" bgcolor="bbffbb"
| 101 || July 29 || Blue Jays || 3–2 || Rowland-Smith (1–1) || Halladay (11–4) || Aardsma (25) || 32,649 || 53–48
|- align="center" bgcolor="ffbbbb"
| 102 || July 30 || @ Rangers || 7–1 || Holland (4–6) || Olson (3–5) || || 23,949 || 53–49
|- align="center" bgcolor="ffbbbb"
| 103 || July 31 || @ Rangers || 5–4 || Padilla (8–5) || Vargas (3–5) || Wilson (12) || 36,901 || 53–50
|-

|- bgcolor="ffbbbb"
|- align="center" bgcolor="bbffbb"
| 104 || August 1 || @ Rangers || 7–2 || Hernández (12–4) || Hunter (3–2) || || 29,458 || 54–50
|- align="center" bgcolor="ffbbbb"
| 105 || August 2 || @ Rangers || 4–2 || Feldman (10–4) || White (2–2) || Wilson (13) || 28,670 || 54–51
|- align="center" bgcolor="bbffbb"
| 106 || August 4 || @ Royals || 7–6 || Kelley (3–1) || Wright (1–4) || Aardsma (26) || 15,057 || 55–51
|- align="center" bgcolor="bbffbb"
| 107 || August 5 || @ Royals || 11–6 || French (2–2) || Davies (3–8) || || 27,805 || 56–51
|- align="center" bgcolor="ffbbbb"
| 108 || August 6 || @ Royals || 8–2 || Chen (1–6) || Vargas (3–6) || || 15,103 || 56–52
|- align="center" bgcolor="bbffbb"
| 109 || August 7 || Rays || 7 – 6 (11) || Kelley (4–1) || Howell (6–3) || || 44,378 || 57–52
|- align="center" bgcolor="ffbbbb"
| 110 || August 8 || Rays || 10–4 || Shields (7–8) || Jakubauskas (5–7) || || 28,239 || 57–53
|- align="center" bgcolor="bbffbb"
| 111 || August 9 || Rays || 11–2 || Rowland-Smith (2–1) || Kazmir (6–7) || || 28,490 || 58–53
|- align="center" bgcolor="bbffbb"
| 112 || August 10 || White Sox || 6–4 || White (3–2) || Floyd (9–7) || Aardsma (27)|| 21,049 || 59–53
|- align="center" bgcolor="ffbbbb"
| 113 || August 11 || White Sox || 3–1 || Danks (10–8) || Aardsma (3–4) || Jenks (23) || 19,385 || 59–54
|- align="center" bgcolor="bbffbb"
| 114 || August 12 || White Sox || 1 – 0 (14) || Jakubauskas (6–7) || Peña (1–1) || || 24,427 || 60–54
|- align="center" bgcolor="ffbbbb"
| 115 || August 13 || Yankees || 11–1 || Sabathia (13–7) || Snell (3–8) || || 33,585 || 60–55
|- align="center" bgcolor="ffbbbb"
| 116 || August 14 || Yankees || 4–2 || Hughes (5–3) || Lowe (1–5) || Rivera (34) || 36,769 || 60–56
|- align="center" bgcolor="ffbbbb"
| 117 || August 15 || Yankees || 5–2 || Mitre (2–1) || French (2–3) || Rivera (35) || 44,272 || 60–57
|- align="center" bgcolor="bbffbb"
| 118 || August 16 || Yankees || 10–3 || Fister (1–0) || Chamberlain (8–3) || || 45,210 || 61–57
|- bgcolor="ffbbbb"
| 119 || August 18 || @ Tigers || 5–3 || Seay (3–2) || Lowe (1–6) || Rodney (25) || 33,710 || 61–58
|- bgcolor="bbffbb"
| 120 || August 19 || @ Tigers || 3–1 || Snell (3–9) || Verlander (13–7) || Aardsma (28)|| 33,194 || 62–58
|- bgcolor="ffbbbb"
| 121 || August 20 || @ Tigers || 7–6 || Seay (4–2) || Aardsma (3–5) || || 31,167 || 62–59
|- align="center" bgcolor="bbffbb"
| 122 || August 21 || @ Indians || 9–4 || French (3–3) || Huff (7–7) || || 28,503 || 63–59
|- align="center" bgcolor="ffbbbb" 
| 123 || August 22 || @ Indians || 4–3 || Pérez (2–2) || Messenger (0–1) || || 28,942 || 63–60
|- align="center" bgcolor="ffbbbb" 
| 124 || August 23 || @ Indians || 6–1 || Carmona (3–7) || Hernández (12–5) || || 23,086 || 63–61
|- align="center" bgcolor="bbffbb"
| 125 || August 24 || Athletics || 3–1 || Snell (4–9) || Mazzaro (4–9) || Aardsma (29) || 21,056 || 64–61
|- align="center" bgcolor="bbffbb"
| 126 || August 25 || Athletics || 4–2 || Lowe (2–6) || Breslow (5–7) || || 17,661 || 65–61
|- align="center" bgcolor="bbffbb"
| 127 || August 26 || Athletics || 5–3 || French (4–3) || G. Gonzalez (4–5) || Aardsma (30) || 18,695 || 66–61
|- align="center" bgcolor="ffbbbb" 
| 128 || August 27 || Royals || 8–4 || Davies (5–9) || Fister (1–1) || || 19,345 || 66–62
|- align="center" bgcolor="bbffbb"
| 129 || August 28 || Royals || 6–3 || Hernández (13–5) || Bannister (7–11) || Aardsma (31) || 26,714 || 67–62
|- align="center" bgcolor="bbffbb"
| 130 || August 29 || Royals || 8–4 || Snell (5–9) || Meche (6–10) || || 26,457 || 68–62
|- align="center" bgcolor="ffbbbb" 
| 131 || August 30 || Royals || 3–0 || Greinke (13–8) || Rowland-Smith (2–2) || || 30,286 || 68–63
|- align="center" bgcolor="ffbbbb"
| 132 || August 31 || Angels || 10–0 || Saunders (11–7) || French (4–4) || || 18,959 || 68–64
|-

|- bgcolor="ffbbbb"
|- align="center" bgcolor="bbffbb"
| 133 || September 1 || Angels || 2–1 || Fister (2–1) || Oliver (4–1) || Aardsma (31) || 18,542 || 69–64
|- align="center" bgcolor="bbffbb"
| 134 || September 2 || Angels || 3–0 || Hernández (14–5) || Kazmir (8–8) || Aardsma (32) || 22,130 || 70–64
|- align="center" bgcolor="bbffbb"
| 135 || September 3 || @ Athletics || 7–4 || Snell (6–9) || Tomko (3–3) || Aardsma (34) || 10,297 || 71–64
|- align="center" bgcolor="bbffbb"
| 136 || September 4 || @ Athletics || 6–3 || Rowland-Smith (3–2) || Mortensen (0–2) || Lowe (2) || 11,738 || 72–64
|- align="center" bgcolor="ffbbbb"
| 137 || September 5 || @ Athletics || 9–5 || Anderson (8–10) || French (4–5) || Bailey (22) || 16,495 || 72–65
|- align="center" bgcolor="ffbbbb"
| 138 || September 6 || @ Athletics || 5–2 || G. Gonzalez (5–5) || Kelley (4–2) || Bailey (23) || 16,188 || 72–66
|- align="center" bgcolor="ffbbbb"
| 139 || September 8 || @ Angels || 3 – 2 (10) || Palmer (10–1) || Batista (6–4) || || 37,725 || 72–67
|- align="center" bgcolor="ffbbbb"
| 140 || September 9 || @ Angels || 6–3 || Weaver (15–5) || Snell (6–10) || Fuentes (40) || 36,340 || 72–68
|- align="center" bgcolor="ffbbbb"
| 141 || September 10 || @ Angels || 3–0 || Lackey (10–7) || Rowland-Smith (3–3) || || 37,412 || 72–69
|- align="center" bgcolor="bbbbbb"
| || September 11 || @ Rangers || colspan=6 |Postponed (rain); rescheduled for September 13
|- align="center" bgcolor="bbffbb"
| 142 || September 12 || @ Rangers || 8–3 || Morrow (1–4) || Millwood (10–10) || || 22,468 || 73–69
|- align="center" bgcolor="ffbbbb"
| 143 || September 13 || @ Rangers || 7–2 || Hunter (8–3) || Fister (2–2) || || || 73–70
|- align="center" bgcolor="bbffbb"
| 144 || September 13 || @ Rangers || 5–0 || Hernández (15–5) || Holland (7–11) || || 18,522 || 74–70
|- align="center" bgcolor="ffbbbb"
| 145 || September 15 || White Sox || 6–3 || García (2–2) || Kelley (4–3) || Jenks (29) || 17,153 || 74–71
|- align="center" bgcolor="bbffbb"
| 146 || September 16 || White Sox || 4–1 || Rowland-Smith (4–3) || Floyd (11–11) || Aardsma (35) || 16,596 || 75–71
|- align="center" bgcolor="bbffbb"
| 147 || September 17 || White Sox || 4 – 3 (14) || Kelley (5–3) || Linebrink (3–7) || || 16,336 || 76–71
|- align="center" bgcolor="bbffbb"
| 148 || September 18 || Yankees || 3–2 || Hernández (16–5) || Rivera (3–3) || || 28,395 || 77–71
|- align="center" bgcolor="ffbbbb"
| 149 || September 19 || Yankees || 10–1 || Sabathia (18–7) || Fister (2–3) || || 43,173 || 77–72
|- align="center" bgcolor="bbffbb"
| 150 || September 20 || Yankees || 7–1 || Snell (7–10) || Chamberlain (8–6) || || 35,885 || 78–72 
|- align="center" bgcolor="bbffbb"
| 151 || September 22 || @ Rays || 4–3 || Batista (7–4) || Wheeler (4–5) || Lowe (3) || 12,514 || 79–72
|- align="center" bgcolor="ffbbbb"
| 152 || September 23 || @ Rays || 5–4 || Springer (1–4) || Lowe (2–7) || Choate (5) || 13,009 || 79–73
|- align="center" bgcolor="bbffbb"
| 153 || September 24 || @ Blue Jays || 5–4 || Hernández (17–5) || Carlson (1–6) || Aardsma (36) || 15,306 || 80–73
|- align="center" bgcolor="ffbbbb"
| 154 || September 25 || @ Blue Jays || 5–0 || Halladay (16–10) || Fister (2–4) || || 20,668 || 80–74
|- align="center" bgcolor="ffbbbb"
| 155 || September 26 || @ Blue Jays || 5 – 4 (10) || Frasor (7–3) || Kelley (5–4) || || 29,783 || 80–75
|- align="center" bgcolor="ffbbbb"
| 156 || September 27 || @ Blue Jays || 5–4 || Wolfe (2–2) || Rowland-Smith (4–4) || Camp (1) || 39,052 || 80–76
|- align="center" bgcolor="bbffbb"
| 157 || September 29 || Athletics || 6–4 || Hernández (18–5) || Cahill (10–13) || || 18,167 || 81–76
|- align="center" bgcolor="bbffbb"
| 158 || September 30 || Athletics || 7–0 || Morrow (2–4) || Mortensen (2–4) || || 16,930 || 82–76
|-

|- bgcolor="ffbbbb"
|- align="center" bgcolor="bbffbb"
| 159 || October 1 || Athletics || 4–2 || Fister (3–4) || Anderson (11–11) || Aardsma (37) || 16,607 || 83–76
|- align="center" bgcolor="ffbbbb"
| 160 || October 2 || Rangers || 7–4 || Wilson (5–6) || Aardsma (3–6) || Francisco (26) || 27,899 || 83–77
|- align="center" bgcolor="bbffbb"
| 161 || October 3 || Rangers || 2–1 || Rowland-Smith (5–4) || Hunter (9–6) || Batista (1) || 24,391 || 84–77
|- align="center" bgcolor="bbffbb"
| 162 || October 4 || Rangers || 4–3 || Hernández (19–5) || Feldman (17–8) || Aardsma (38) || 32,260 || 85–77
|-

Roster

Player stats

Batting
Note: G = Games played; AB = At bats; R = Runs scored; H = Hits; 2B = Doubles; 3B = Triples; HR = Home runs; RBI = Runs batted in; AVG = Batting average; SB = Stolen bases

Through October 4, 2009

Pitching

Starting and other pitchers
Note: G = Games pitched; GS = Games started (for pitchers who did not start every appearance); IP = Innings pitched; W = Wins; L = Losses; ERA = Earned run average; SO = Strikeouts

Through October 4, 2009

Relief pitchers
Note: G = Games pitched; IP = Innings pitched; W = Wins; L = Losses; SV = Saves; SVO = Save opportunities; ERA = Earned run average; SO = Strikeouts

Through October 4, 2009

Team totals
Note: G = Games pitched; IP = Innings pitched; W = Wins; L = Losses; SV = Saves; SVO = Save opportunities; CG = Complete games; SHO = Shutouts; ERA = Earned run average; SO = Strikeouts

Through October 4, 2009

Farm system

LEAGUE CHAMPIONS: AZL Mariners

Major League Baseball Draft

Below is a complete list of the Seattle Mariners draft picks from the two 2009 Major League Baseball drafts.

The 2009 Major League Baseball draft was held June 9 to June 11 at the MLB Network Studios in New York City. The Seattle Mariners went second in the draft order and had two supplemental first-round draft picks for the loss of free agent Raúl Ibáñez after the  season. The Mariners selected a total of 52 players and signed 35 of those selected players.

The Mariners selected one player in the Major League Baseball phase of the 2009 Rule 5 draft. They also had one player selected (Marshall Hubbard) in the 2009 Triple-A phase of the Rule 5 draft. The Mariners also selected one player in the Triple-A phase of the draft as well.

June amateur draft

Key

Table

Rule 5 draft

Key

Table

References

Game logs:
1st half: Seattle Mariners game log on ESPN.com
2nd half: Seattle Mariners game log on ESPN.com
Batting statistics: Seattle Mariners Batting Stats on ESPN.com
Pitching statistics: Seattle Mariners Pitching Stats on ESPN.com

External links

2009 Seattle Mariners season at Baseball Reference
2009 Seattle Mariners season official site 

Seattle Mariners seasons
Seattle Mariners season
2009 in sports in Washington (state)